Octagonal buildings and structures are characterized by an octagonal plan form, whether a perfect geometric octagon or a regular eight-sided polygon with approximately equal sides.

Octagon-shaped buildings date from at least 300 B.C. when the Tower of the Winds in Athens, Greece, was constructed. Octagonal houses were popularized in the United States in the mid-19th century by Orson Squire Fowler and many other octagonal buildings and structures soon followed.

This article is a list of octagonal buildings and structures in the United States, not including octagonal houses (which are covered at List of octagon houses). Many of these are on the National Register of Historic Places.

Barber shops
 Dickey's Octagonal Barbershop, Rives, Tennessee

Churches, chapels, synagogues, etc.
 Alberts Chapel, Sand Ridge, West Virginia
 Falcon Tabernacle, Falcon, North Carolina
 First Congregational Church, U.C.C. (Naponee, Nebraska)
 Follen Church Society-Unitarian Universalist, Lexington, Massachusetts
 Holy Ghost Catholic Church (Kula, Hawaii)
 McBee Methodist Church, Conestee, South Carolina
 Mercy Chapel at Mill Run, Selbysport, Maryland
 Seney-Stovall Chapel, Athens, Georgia
 Conference Point Chapel Williams Bay, Wisconsin
 Seventh Church of Christ, Scientist (Seattle, Washington), an irregular octagon
 St. Clare's Church (Staten Island, New York)
 The Temple (Old Orchard Beach, Maine)
 Third Church of Christ, Scientist (Washington, D.C.) (demolished)
 Union Chapel (Oak Bluffs, Massachusetts)
 Cottage Grove Museum (Cottage Grove, Oregon) (formerly St. Mary's Catholic Church)

Farm buildings including barns

 Fobes Octagon Barn, Lanesboro, Iowa
 Kinney Octagon Barn, Burr Oak, Iowa
 Octagon Barn (Jamaica, Iowa)
 Bird Octagonal Mule Barn, Shelby County, Kentucky
 Octagonal Poultry House, Cold Spring, New Jersey
 Roberts Octagon Barn, Sharon Center, Iowa
 Secrest Octagon Barn, Downey, Iowa
 Tim Thering Octagon Barn (Plain, Wisconsin)

Forts
 Fort Edgecomb, Maine

Government buildings
 Navajo Nation Council Chamber, a National Historic Landmark, Window Rock, Arizona
 Octagon Building (Santa Cruz, California)

Halls
 Franklin County G. A. R. Soldiers' Memorial Hall, Hampton, Iowa
 Octagon Hall Museum, Franklin, Kentucky - built by Andrew Jackson Caldwell (NRHP)
 Chautauqua Auditorium, Waxahachie, Texas

High rises
 Tower Life Building, San Antonio, Texas

Hospitals and insane asylums
 The Octagon (Roosevelt Island, New York)

Hotels
 Brightwood Beach Cottage, Litchfield, Minnesota
 Octagon Hotel, Oyster Bay, New York

Houses
Poplar Forest, Bedford, Virginia
List of octagon houses, a list of many individual dwellings.

Jails

 Daviess County Rotary Jail and Sheriff's Residence, Gallatin, Missouri

Libraries

 Andover Public Library (Andover, Maine)
 Atlanta Public Library, Atlanta, Illinois
 Goodnow Library, Sudbury, Massachusetts
 Waring Library, on the former campus of Porter Military Academy, Charleston, South Carolina
 Red Hook Public Library, (Red Hook, New York)
 Ram Dass Library, Omega Institute (Rhinebeck, New York)

Lighthouses
 Eldred Rock Light, Alaska
 Cape Henry Light, Virginia
 Point Judith Light, Rhode Island
 Portland Observatory, Maine
 Blackwell Island Lighthouse, New York

Markets

 City Market (Petersburg, Virginia)

Park and fair buildings
Floral Hall, Lexington, Kentucky
 Highland Park Dentzel Carousel and Shelter Building, Meridian, Mississippi

Post offices
 Old Post Office (Liberty, Maine)

Schools and colleges

 Birmingham Friends Meetinghouse and Octagonal School (1819), Birmingham Township, Pennsylvania
Mount Washington Octagon (c.1855), Baltimore, Maryland, built for the Mt. Washington Female Academy, later used home of Mount St. Agnes College, a Baltimore City Landmark
 The "Bee Hive", a former schoolhouse built by Quakers in 1859 in Skaneateles, New York
 Charter Oak Schoolhouse (1873), Schuline, Illinois
 Diamond Rock Schoolhouse (1818), Tredyffrin Township, Chester County, Pennsylvania
 District No. 13 School (1898), Ortonville, Minnesota, NRHP-listed in Big Stone County
 District No. 92 School (1906), Jackson, Minnesota, NRHP-listed in Jackson County
 Florence Corners School, Florence, Ohio
 Cowles Hall, Elmira College, Elmira, New York
 Hood Octagonal School, Newtown Township (Delaware Co.), Pennsylvania
 Modern Times School, Brentwood, New York
 Malmborg School, Bozeman, Montana
 Octagonal Schoolhouse (Cowgill's Corner, Delaware)
 Octagonal Schoolhouse (Essex, New York)
 Octagon Stone Schoolhouse, South Canaan, Pennsylvania
 Sheldon Jackson School, Sitka, Alaska
 Sodom Schoolhouse, Montandon, Pennsylvania
 Wrightstown Octagonal Schoolhouse, Wrightstown, Pennsylvania
Former schoolhouse, later home of Egg Harbor Historical Society, 533 London Ave., Egg Harbor City, New Jersey. at

Stores
 Andrew Gildersleeve Octagonal Building, Mattituck, New York, combination residence and store

See also
 Octagon barn (disambiguation)
 Octagon Building (disambiguation)
 Octagon House (disambiguation)
 Octagonal Schoolhouse (disambiguation)

References